Eugene Carlton White (June 21, 1932 – July 7, 2017) was a former defensive back in the National Football League. He played with the Green Bay Packers during the 1954 NFL season.

References

Players of American football from Greensboro, North Carolina
Green Bay Packers players
American football defensive backs
Georgia Bulldogs football players
1932 births
2017 deaths